Sheikh Abaadir Umar Al-Rida Fiqi Umar (Harari: አባዲር ዑመር አል-ሪዳ ፈቂ ዑመር), also known as Aw Abadir was the legendary founder of Harar and a patron saint in modern-day eastern Ethiopia. The modern Harari people regard him as their common ancestor, as does the Somali Sheekhaal clan.

History
Aw Abadir is the main figure in the Fath Madinat Al Harar, an unpublished history of Harar in the 13th century. According to the account, he along with several other religious leaders traveled from the Hijaz region of present-day Saudi Arabia to Harar in 612AD. Sheikh Umar Al-Rida subsequently married a local
Harari woman, and constructed the city's Jamia mosque.

Places
Aw Abadir Stadium, proposed stadium in Harar city
Abadir mosque, largest mosque in Addis Ababa, Ethiopia

See also
Emirate of Harar
Siddiqis in the Horn of Africa

Notes

References
Michael Belaynesh, Stanisław Chojnacki, Richard Pankhurst, The Dictionary of Ethiopian Biography: From early times to the end of the Zagwé dynasty c. 1270 A.D, (Institute of Ethiopian Studies, Addis Ababa University: 1975)

External links
Emir Sheikh Abadir Musa Warwaje’le

Islam in Ethiopia
Ethnic Somali people
Year of birth unknown
Year of death unknown
People from Harari Region